The 2021 Northwestern Wildcats baseball team was a baseball team that represented Northwestern University in the 2021 NCAA Division I baseball season. The Wildcats were members of the Big Ten Conference and played their home games at Rocky Miller Park in Evanston, Illinois. They were led by sixth-year head coach Spencer Allen.

Previous season
The Wildcats finished the 2020 NCAA Division I baseball season 6–6 overall (0–0 conference) and ninth place in conference standings, as the season was cut short in stages by March 12 due to the COVID-19 pandemic.

Preseason
In October, 2020, the Wildcats announced the addition of Charlie Tilson to the coaching staff as a volunteer assistant.

Roster

Schedule

! style="" | Regular Season
|- valign="top" 

|- bgcolor="#ffcccc"
| 1 || March 5 || vs  || U.S. Bank Stadium • Minneapolis, Minnesota || 3–6 || Dees (1–0) || Bader (0–1) || Shingle (1) || 90 || 0–1 || 0–1
|- bgcolor="#ccffcc"
| 2 || March 6 || vs Penn State || U.S. Bank Stadium • Minneapolis, Minnesota || 2–0 || Uberstine (1–0) || Larkin (0–1) || Moe (1) || 50 || 1–1 || 1–1
|- bgcolor="#ccffcc"
| 3 || March 6 || vs Penn State || U.S. Bank Stadium • Minneapolis, Minnesota || 5–2 || Smith (1–0) || Freilich (0–1) || Lawrence (1) || 50 || 2–1 || 2–1
|- bgcolor="#ffcccc"
| 4 || March 7 || vs Penn State || U.S. Bank Stadium • Minneapolis, Minnesota || 10–13 || Rogers (1–0) || Grable  (0–1) || Miller (1) || 75 || 2–2 || 2–2
|- bgcolor="#ccffcc"
| 5 || March 12 || vs  || Fluor Field at the West End • Greenville, South Carolina || 14–2 || Doherty (1–0) || Benschoter (0–1) || None || 225 || 3–2 || 3–2
|- bgcolor="#ccffcc"
| 6 || March 13 || vs Michigan State || Fluor Field at the West End • Greenville, South Carolina || 4–2 || Lavelle (1–0) || Erla (1–1) || Boeckle (1) || 225 || 4–2 || 4–2
|- bgcolor="#ffcccc"
| 7 || March 13 || vs Michigan State || Fluor Field at the West End • Greenville, South Carolina || 3–12 || Berghost (1–0) || Uberstine (1–1) || None || 225 || 4–3 || 4–3
|- bgcolor="#ccffcc"
| 8 || March 14 || vs Michigan State || Fluor Field at the West End • Greenville, South Carolina || 7–5 || Boeckle (1–0) || Iverson (0–1) || None || 201 || 5–3 || 5–3
|- bgcolor="#ccffcc"
| 9 || March 20 || at  || U.S. Bank Stadium • Minneapolis, Minnesota || 4–3 || Lavelle (2–0) || Skoro (1–2) || Moe (2) || 100 || 6–3 || 6–3
|- bgcolor="#ccffcc"
| 10 || March 21 || at Minnesota || U.S. Bank Stadium • Minneapolis, Minnesota || 10–3 || Uberstin (2–1) || Culliver (0–1) || None || 100 || 7–3 || 7–3
|- bgcolor="#ffcccc"
| 11 || March 22 || at Minnesota || U.S. Bank Stadium • Minneapolis, Minnesota || 3–7 || Burchill (1–0) || Saucer (0–1) || None || 75 || 7–4 || 7–4
|- bgcolor="#ffcccc"
| 12 || March 26 || at  || Illinois Field • Champaign, Illinois || 8–12 || Lavender (3–0) || Boeckle (1–1) || None || 73 || 7–5 || 7–5
|- bgcolor="#ccffcc"
| 13 || March 27 || at Illinois || Illinois Field • Champaign, Illinois || 16–14 || Dyke (1–0) || Kutt (0–1) || Lawrence (2) || 81 || 8–5 || 8–5
|- bgcolor="#ccffcc"
| 14 || March 28 || at Illinois || Illinois Field • Champaign, Illinois || 12–5 || Lavelle (3–0) || Kirschsieper (1–2) || Smith (1) || 75 || 9–5 || 9–5
|-

|- bgcolor="#ffcccc"
| 15 || April 2 || at Maryland || Bob "Turtle" Smith Stadium • College Park, Maryland || 3–4 || Falco (1–0) || Smith (1–1) || Bello (2) || 150 || 9–6 || 9–6
|- bgcolor="#ffcccc"
| 16 || April 3 || at Maryland || Bob "Turtle" Smith Stadium • College Park, Maryland || 4–8 || Ramsey (1–1) || Moe (0–1) || None || 150 || 9–7 || 9–7
|- bgcolor="#ffcccc"
| 17 || April 3 || vs No. 25 Michigan || Bob "Turtle" Smith Stadium • College Park, Maryland || 2–5 || Pace (2–0) || Boeckle (1–2) || Weiss (1) || 100 || 9–8 || 9–8
|- bgcolor="#ccffcc"
| 18 || April 4 || vs No. 25 Michigan || Bob "Turtle" Smith Stadium • College Park, Maryland || 4–1 || Lavelle (4–0) || Dragani (2–2) || Lawrence (3) || 100 || 10–8 || 10–8
|- bgcolor="#ccffcc"
| 19 || April 9 ||  || Rocky Miller Park • Evanston, Illinois || 6–5 || Boeckle (2–2) || McLain (0–1) || None || 50 || 11–8 || 11–8
|- bgcolor="#ffcccc"
| 20 || April 10 || Rutgers || Rocky Miller Park • Evanston, Illinois || 4–8 || Wereski (4–1) || Uberstine (2–2) || Muller (2) || 50 || 11–9 || 11–9
|- bgcolor="#ffcccc"
| 21 || April 11 || Rutgers || Rocky Miller Park • Evanston, Illinois || 5–6 || Fitzpatrick (2–1) || Smith (2–1) || McLain (1) || 50 || 11–10 || 11–10
|- bgcolor="#ffcccc"
| 22 || April 16 || Indiana || Rocky Miller Park • Evanston, Illinois || 4–5 || Sommer (4–1) || Doherty (1–1) || Litwicki (4) || 57 || 11–11 || 11–11
|- bgcolor="#ccffcc"
| 23 || April 17 || Indiana || Rocky Miller Park • Evanston, Illinois || 8–5 || Lawrence (1–0) || Tucker (0–1) || None || 63 || 12–11 || 12–11
|- bgcolor="#ffcccc"
| 24 || April 18 || Indiana || Rocky Miller Park • Evanston, Illinois || 0–4 || Bierman (2–2) || Lavelle (4–1) || None || – || 12–12 || 12–12
|- bgcolor="#ffcccc"
| 25 || April 24 || vs Maryland || Duane Banks Field • Iowa City, Iowa || 1–2 || Ott (1–0) || Doherty (1–2) || Falco (1) || – || 12–13 || 12–13
|- bgcolor="#ffcccc"
| 26 || April 25 || vs Maryland || Duane Banks Field • Iowa City, Iowa || 7–9 || Fisher (1–3) || Uberstine (2–3) || None || – || 12–14 || 12–14
|- bgcolor="#ffcccc"
| 27 || April 25 || at Iowa || Duane Banks Field • Iowa City, Iowa || 4–15 || Baumann (4–2) || Lavelle (4–2) || None || 657 || 12–15 || 12–15
|- bgcolor="#ffcccc"
| 28 || April 26 || at Iowa || Duane Banks Field • Iowa City, Iowa || 9–12 || Nedved (3–0) || Smith (1–3) || None || 544 || 12–16 || 12–16
|- bgcolor="#bbbbbb"
| – || April 30 || Michigan || Rocky Miller Park • Evanston, Illinois ||colspan=9| Cancelled due to COVID-19 protocols
|-

|- bgcolor="#bbbbbb"
| – || May 1 || Michigan || Rocky Miller Park • Evanston, Illinois ||colspan=9| Cancelled due to COVID-19 protocols
|- bgcolor="#bbbbbb"
| – || May 2 || Illinois || Rocky Miller Park • Evanston, Illinois ||colspan=9| Cancelled due to COVID-19 protocols
|- bgcolor="#bbbbbb"
| – || May 3 || Illinois || Rocky Miller Park • Evanston, Illinois ||colspan=9| Cancelled due to COVID-19 protocols
|- bgcolor="#bbbbbb"
| – || May 7 || at Purdue || Alexander Field • West Lafayette, Indiana ||colspan=9| Cancelled due to COVID-19 protocols
|- bgcolor="#bbbbbb"
| – || May 8 || at Purdue || Alexander Field • West Lafayette, Indiana ||colspan=9| Cancelled due to COVID-19 protocols
|- bgcolor="#bbbbbb"
| – || May 9 || at Purdue || Alexander Field • West Lafayette, Indiana ||colspan=9| Cancelled due to COVID-19 protocols
|- bgcolor="#ffcccc"
| 29 || May 14 || at Nebraska || Haymarket Park • Lincoln, Nebraska || 2–12 || Povich (5–1) || Doherty (1–3) || None || 3,058 || 12–17 || 12–17
|- bgcolor="#ffcccc"
| 30 || May 15 || at Nebraska || Haymarket Park • Lincoln, Nebraska || 5–11 || Schreiber (2–2) || Pagliarini (0–1) || Bunz (1) || 3,523 || 12–18 || 12–18
|- bgcolor="#bbbbbb"
| – || May 16 || at Nebraska || Haymarket Park • Lincoln, Nebraska ||colspan=9| Cancelled due to COVID-19 protocols
|- align="center" bgcolor="#ffcccc"
| 31 || May 21 || Iowa || Rocky Miller Park • Evanston, Illinois || 1–6 || Wallace (6–1) || Doherty (1–4) || None || 165 || 12–19 || 12–19
|- align="center" bgcolor="#ccffcc"
| 32 || May 22 || Iowa || Rocky Miller Park • Evanston, Illinois|| 5–4 || Lawrence (2–0) || Nedved (4–1) || None || 213 || 13–19 || 13–19
|- align="center" bgcolor="#ccffcc"
| 33 || May 23 || Iowa || Rocky Miller Park • Evanston, Illinois || 8–6 || Pate (1–0) || Irvine (2–5) || None || 185 || 14–19 || 14–19
|- align="center" bgcolor="#ffcccc"
| 34 || May 28 || at Ohio State || Bill Davis Stadium • Columbus, Ohio || 10–13 || Pfennig (1–3) || Pate (1–1) || Brock (8) || 183 || 14–20|| 14–20
|- align="center" bgcolor="#ffcccc"
| 35 || May 29 || at Ohio State || Bill Davis Stadium • Columbus, Ohio || 1–4 || Burhenn (7–2) || Christie (0–1) || Brock (9) || 270 || 14–21 || 14–21
|- align="center" bgcolor="#ccffcc"
| 36 || May 30 || at Ohio State || Bill Davis Stadium • Columbus, Ohio || 8–2 || Uberstine (3–3) || Haberthier (0–1) || None || 350 || 15–21 || 15–21
|-

Awards

Big Ten Conference Players of the Week

Conference awards

2021 MLB draft

References

Northwestern
Northwestern Wildcats baseball seasons
Northwestern